"My Love Is Pink" is a song by English girl group Sugababes from their fifth studio album, Change (2007). It was written by band members Keisha Buchanan and Heidi Range in collaboration with the songwriting and production team Xenomania, who produced the song. "My Love Is Pink" is an uptempo dance-pop and electropop song, reminiscent of those performed by British girl group, Girls Aloud. The song was released on 10 December 2007 in the United Kingdom and Ireland as the second single from Change. It received mixed reviews from critics, who praised the composition and sound, but criticised its lyrical content. The song peaked at number five on the UK Commercial Pop Club chart and number 51 on the Slovakian Singles Chart.

Background and composition

"My Love Is Pink" was written by Sugababes members Keisha Buchanan and Heidi Range in collaboration with the British songwriting and production team Xenomania, consisting of Miranda Cooper, Brian Higgins, Tim Powell, Lisa Cowling and Nick Coler. Higgins and Xenomania produced the song. It was mixed by Powell and Higgins; programmed it with Cooper and Gray.  "My Love Is Pink" was sent to digital retailers in the United Kingdom and Ireland on 10 December 2007 as the second single from Change.

The song is an uptempo dance-pop and electropop record with a high-energy dance beat. The instrumentation is provided by keyboards and a guitar. Nick Levine of Digital Spy described it as a "slightly unhinged handbag anthem operating at the point where nineties dance and noughties electro collide". Several critics noted similarities between the song and those performed by British girl group, Girls Aloud. "My Love Is Pink" was also considered by critics to be a gay anthem.

Reception

The song received mixed reviews from critics, who were ambivalent towards its composition. Thomas H Green of The Daily Telegraph described it as "belligerently fizzing pop". Alexis Petridis of The Guardian labelled the track as "propulsive" and regarded it as a classy example of the group's "trademark clever, referential pop". Victoria Segal of The Times described "My Love Is Pink" as indestructible, and wrote that it confirms the group's status as "the bionic band". Lauren Murphy of Entertainment Ireland characterised it as one of the album's "sense-stirring tracks", while BBC's Tom Young praised the track as "sassy and Girls Aloud-like". According to Leon McDermott of The Sunday Herald, the song "jumps and squelches with its sassy brio". A critic from The Liverpool Daily Post & Echo considered it one of the album's highlights.

However, the song's lyrics were a focal point for criticism. Andy Gill of The Independent dismissed it as a "euphemism too far", while Keith Bruce of The Sunday Herald called the song "lyrically awful". Gavin Martin of the Daily Mirror described it a "frisky but a pale reflection of past G.A.Y. disco glories". Hot Press magazine's Pete Murphy felt that the song was a let-down and called it "standard dancefloor fodder veneered with a patina of urban and/or Afro-Caribbean sophistication". A writer for The Scotsman stated that regarded the song as "another of those anonymous, mass-produced party hits sung by a faceless rent-a-vocalist". Upon its release as a single, "My Love Is Pink" peaked at number five on the UK Commercial Pop Club chart, and number 51 on the Slovakian Singles Chart.

Live performances
"My Love Is Pink" was included in the set list for the Sugababes' 2008 Change Tour, in which they wore silver, plastic dresses. The trio performed the song at the Oxegen 2008 festival as part of a set list, which included their number one singles "Freak like Me", "Round Round", "Hole in the Head", "Push the Button" and "About You Now".

Track listings and formats
Digital single
 My Love Is Pink (Radio Version) – 3:44

Credits and personnel
Songwriting – Keisha Buchanan, Heidi Range, Miranda Cooper, Brian Higgins, Tim Powell, Lisa Cowling, Nick Coler
Production – Brian Higgins, Xenomania
Mixing – Tim Powell, Brian Higgins
Keyboards – Tim Powell, Brian Higgins, Miranda Cooper, Matt Gray
Guitar – Nick Coler, Owen Parker
Programming – Tim Powell, Brian Higgins, Miranda Cooper, Matt Gray
Vocals – Sugababes

Credits adapted from the liner notes of Change, Island Records.

Charts

Release history

References

2007 singles
2007 songs
Island Records singles
Song recordings produced by Xenomania
Songs written by Brian Higgins (producer)
Songs written by Heidi Range
Songs written by Keisha Buchanan
Songs written by Lisa Cowling
Songs written by Miranda Cooper
Songs written by Nick Coler
Sugababes songs